Chris Paul (born 1985) is an American basketball player.

Chris Paul may also refer to:

Chris Paul (American football) (born 1998), American football player
Christopher Paul (born 1964), American-born Islamic militant